Partridge Island is an island in Delaware County, New York. It is located northwest of Fishs Eddy, on the East Branch Delaware River.

References

River islands of New York (state)
Landforms of Delaware County, New York
Islands of the Delaware River